Ambrishrao Satyavanrao (born 15 October 1985) is a member of the 13th Maharashtra Legislative Assembly. He represents the Aheri Assembly Constituency, in the Gadchiroli district of Maharashtra. He belongs to the Bharatiya Janata Party. He was the State Minister of Tribal Development, Forests & Gadchiroli Guardian minister for Maharashtra State Government

Early life

Education and early career
Raje Ambrishrao has done Business Law and HRM Level 4, University of Central England, Birmingham Business School United Kingdom, Passing year 2006.

Family and personal life
Mother name - Rani rukmini devi,
younger brother - kumar Avdheshrao atram

His father was from nag vidharbha andolan samiti after his death amrishrao joined bjp and after being elected for first time in 2014_2019 he got major ministries as well as guardian minister of Gadchiroli district.

See also
 Devendra Fadnavis ministry (2014–)
 Make in Maharashtra

References

Living people
1987 births
Maharashtra MLAs 2014–2019
People from Gadchiroli
Marathi politicians
Bharatiya Janata Party politicians from Maharashtra